The Bowl Championship Series (BCS) is a selection system that began in the 1998 season. It creates match-ups in five bowl games between ten of the top ranked teams in the NCAA Division I Football Bowl Subdivision (FBS), including the BCS National Championship Game.  These are relevant team and individual statistics of BCS games and ranking system.

BCS National Championship Game Statistics
The team leading at halftime is 13–0 in BCS National Championship Games. (In the 2009 game, Florida and Oklahoma were tied at halftime.)

Fourteen Heisman Trophy winners have appeared in BCS Bowl Games, with twelve competing for the national championship.  (Eleven appeared in the year that they won).  Two Heisman Trophy winners have appeared in two BCS bowl games (Jason White in 2004 and 2005, and Matt Leinart in 2005 and 2006).  Their teams have gone 6–8 in those games.

BCS Regular Season Record Statistics
While numerous teams have gone undefeated and appeared in a BCS bowl game, the 1999 Florida State team was the first team ranked No. 1 in the preseason Associated Press Poll to go undefeated and win the National Championship.  USC was also ranked No.1 in preseason and went on to win the National Championship, but that championship was vacated due to rules violations by the school.  No team has won a BCS title ranked No. 3 or No. 4 in preseason.

Only one team not ranked in the AP Top 20 in preseason has ever gone on to win a BCS National Championship. In 2010, The Auburn Tigers began the year ranked No. 22 in the nation. They were also the first team outside of the top 10 since 1990 to even clinch a share of the title.

The worst record for any team to qualify for a BCS bowl berth are the 2012 Wisconsin Badgers at 8–5.  Five 8-4 teams have earned a BCS bowl berth:  Syracuse in 1998, Stanford in 1999, Purdue in 2000, Pittsburgh in 2004, and The University of Connecticut in 2010.  Those five teams lost their BCS Bowl game.

References

Bowl Championship Series